Elections to the Liverpool School Board were held on Friday 16 November 1900. These were held every three years, when all fifteen board members were elected. There were nineteen candidates for the fifteen board member positions.

Each voter had fifteen votes to cast.

After the elections, the composition of the school board was:

* - Retiring board member seeking re-election

Elected

Not Elected

References

1900
Liverpool
1900s in Liverpool
November 1900 events